The 2001 Caribbean Football Union Club Championship was an international club football competition held in the Caribbean to determine the region's qualifiers to the CONCACAF Champions' Cup. The 2001 edition included group play, because CONCACAF expanded the 2002 Champions' Cup to 16 teams. in that tournament,  clubs were not invited.

Group winners Defence Force and W Connection of Trinidad and Tobago advanced to the CONCACAF Champions' Cup 2002.

First round

UWS Upsetters withdrew

Club Franciscain withdrew

Roots Alley Ballers withdrew

HBA Panthers withdrew

Empire FC withdrew

Second round

Group A
Played in Haiti.

 SV Transvaal withdrew

The last match was played in Martinique due to the first match had been abandoned after 45', when the W Connection were winning Racing Club Haïtien by 2-0.

W Connection advance to CONCACAF Champions' Cup 2002

Group B
Played in Trinidad and Tobago.

 Garden Hotspurs FC withdrew

Defence Force advance to CONCACAF Champions' Cup 2002

Top scorers

2001
1